is a professor of Graduate School of Media Design at Keio University and Professor Emeritus of the University of Tokyo.

Education
Dr. Tachi received the B.E., M.S., and Ph.D. degrees in mathematical engineering and information physics from the University of Tokyo in 1968, 1970, and 1973, respectively.

Academic career
He joined the Faculty of Engineering of the University of Tokyo in 1973, and in 1975 moved to the Mechanical Engineering Laboratory, Ministry of International Trade and Industry, Tsukuba Science City, Japan, where he served as the Director of the Biorobotics Division. From 1979 to 1980, Dr. Tachi was a Japanese Government Award Senior Visiting Scientist at the Massachusetts Institute of Technology, Cambridge, USA, and in 1988 he serves as Chairman of the IMEKO (International Measurement Confederation) Technical Committee on Measurement in Robotics. In 1989 he rejoined the University of Tokyo.

Research
His scientific achievements includes intelligent mobile robot systems for the blind called Guide Dog Robot (1976–1983) and National Large Scale Project on Advanced Robotics, especially advanced human robot systems with a real-time sensation of presence known as Telexistence (Tele-Existence) (1983–1990). His present research covers telexistence, real-time remote robotics (R-Cubed) and virtual reality.

Organisational affiliations
Prof. Tachi is also a founding director of the Robotics Society of Japan (RSJ), a fellow of the Society of Instrument and Control Engineers (SICE) and is the founding president of the Virtual Reality Society of Japan (VRSJ). See also his work on cloaking technology.()

External links

1946 births
Living people
University of Tokyo alumni
Virtual reality pioneers
Academic staff of Keio University
Academic staff of the University of Tokyo